Nusantara United Football Club is an Indonesian football club based in the planned new capital of the country, Nusantara. They currently compete in Liga 2.

History
Nusantara United was established following the conclusion of the 2022 PSSI Ordinary Congress on May 30th, 2022. They were formed after the Mataram Utama management handed over control of their senior team to a group of investors, who subsequently rebranded the club as Nusantara United. Mataram Utama themselves still exist as a club, however they seem to refrain from fielding another senior team for the 2022-23 campaign, deciding to focus on youth development and their football academy.

On July 5, in an Instagram post unveiling their new logo, Nusantara United announced that they will represent Nusantara, the future new capital of Indonesia, within the country's footballing pyramid.

While the new Capital City of Nusantara is still in the development stage, Nusantara United has determined to choose Salatiga as a temporary homebase and training camp to prepare the team ahead of the 2022–23 season. However, as the Kridanggo Stadium in Salatiga does not fulfil the necessary requirements to hold Liga 2 matches, Nusantara United will play their league games at the Moch. Soebroto Stadium in nearby Magelang whilst still holding their training sessions and operating their day-to-day activities in Salatiga.

Players

Current squad

Naturalized players

References

Football clubs in Indonesia
Football clubs in East Kalimantan
Association football clubs established in 2022
2022 establishments in Indonesia